This is a list of the members of the first parliament of the Australian Capital Territory Legislative Assembly. It was the Territory's first representative parliament after gaining self-government, and operated from 1989 to 1991.

The first two parliaments were elected under the one-electorate modified d'Hondt method, which was then abolished and replaced with the current three-electorate Hare-Clark system in 1995.

 Michael Moore was elected as a Residents Rally member, but resigned from the party on 24 October 1989 and served out his term as an independent.
 Craig Duby, Carmel Maher and David Prowse were elected as representatives of the No Self-Government Party, but resigned to form the Independents Group on 3 December 1989. Prowse left the Independents Group to join the Liberal Party on 31 July 1990, Duby left to found the Hare-Clark Independent Party on 19 November 1991, and Maher served out her term under the Independents Group name.
 ALP member Paul Whalan resigned from the Assembly on 30 April 1990. The vacancy was filled by the ALP's Terry Connolly.
 Robyn Nolan was elected as a Liberal member, but resigned from the party on 22 October 1991. She became an independent until founding the New Conservative Group on 19 November.

See also
1989 Australian Capital Territory legislative election

Members of Australian Capital Territory parliaments by term
20th-century Australian politicians